Mariam (also Maryam) is the Aramaic form of the given name Miriam, especially used of Mary mother of Jesus in a number of languages. 

It may refer to:

People named Mariam 

 Mariam, daughter of Bagrat IV of Georgia, a member of the Bagrationi dynasty of the Kingdom of Georgia
 Mariam Baharum, Singaporean actress
 Mariam Fakhr Eddine, Egyptian actress
 Mariam Ndagire, Ugandan musician
 Mariam Wallentin, Swedish musician

Others 

MV Mariam, a Bolivian-flagged passenger ferry
Lake Mariam, a lake in Winter Haven, Florida

See also
 Maryam (name)
 Maryam (disambiguation)
 Miriam (disambiguation)